The 2017 New York Red Bulls II season is the club's third season of existence, and their third in United Soccer League, the second-tier of the American soccer pyramid. The Red Bulls II play in the Eastern Division of USL.

Club

Coaching staff

Squad information

Appearances and goals are career totals from all-competitions.

Competitions

Exhibition

USL

Eastern Conference standings

Results

USL Playoffs

Player statistics

Top appearances
As of 4 November 2017.

|-
! colspan="14" style="background:#dcdcdc; text-align:center"| Goalkeepers

|-
! colspan="14" style="background:#dcdcdc; text-align:center"| Defenders

|-
! colspan="14" style="background:#dcdcdc; text-align:center"| Midfielders

|-
! colspan="14" style="background:#dcdcdc; text-align:center"| Forwards

|-
! colspan="14" style="background:#dcdcdc; text-align:center"| Left Club During Season

 Updated to matches played on October 7, 2017.

Top scorers

 Updated to matches played on November 4, 2017.

Assist Leaders

 Updated to matches played on November 4, 2017.
  This table does not include secondary assists.

Clean Sheets

 Updated to matches played on November 4, 2017.

References 

2017
2017 USL season
American soccer clubs 2017 season
2017 in sports in New Jersey
Red Bulls II